Marcel Dandeneau (June 28, 1931February 9, 2017) was an American educator and Democratic Party politician.  He served two terms in the Wisconsin State Assembly, representing northern Racine County, and held local offices in Caledonia, Wisconsin.

Biography 
Born in Racine, Wisconsin, he was the eldest of six children born to Albert and Justine (née Breland) Dandeneau, both French Canadian immigrants.

Dandeneau graduated from St. Catherine's High School in Racine, Wisconsin. He served in the United States Army from 1951 to 1955. Dandeneau then received his bachelor's and master's degree from Dominican College of Racine and worked as a full-time teacher from 1960 through 1989, first at Sturtevant Grade School, then at Mitchell Junior High, where he taught English, History, and Science. He continued to work as a substitute teacher after his retirement in 1989.

He served on the board of supervisors for the town of Caledonia, Wisconsin from 1971 through 1977.  From 1975 to 1979, Dandeneau served in the Wisconsin State Assembly. He then served as chief clerk of the Wisconsin Assembly from 1979 to 1981.

In 1975, Dandeneau was charged with misconduct in office, a felony, and violating state campaign laws in connection with unreported campaign contributions and vested interest in granting a liquor license. He was convicted of misdemeanor violation of campaign finance laws. Paid $500 fine and $10 court costs.

He was charged in 1976 with felony misconduct in public office. Case dismissed.

Dandeneau was re-elected to the Caledonia board of supervisors in 1990 and was chairman of the town board from 1992 to 1995.  For the last 27 years of his life, Dandeneau held a monthly breakfast meeting for Racine politicians and businessmen to discuss the issues of the day.

Dandeneau died from cancer at his home in Caledonia, Wisconsin.

Electoral history

Wisconsin Assembly (1974, 1976, 1978)

| colspan="6" style="text-align:center;background-color: #e9e9e9;"| Primary Election, September 10, 1974

| colspan="6" style="text-align:center;background-color: #e9e9e9;"| General Election, November 5, 1974

| colspan="6" style="text-align:center;background-color: #e9e9e9;"| Primary Election, September 14, 1976

| colspan="6" style="text-align:center;background-color: #e9e9e9;"| General Election, November 2, 1976

| colspan="6" style="text-align:center;background-color: #e9e9e9;"| Primary Election, September 12, 1978

| colspan="6" style="text-align:center;background-color: #e9e9e9;"| General Election, November 7, 1978

United States Senate (1982)

| colspan="6" style="text-align:center;background-color: #e9e9e9;"| Primary Election, September 14, 1982

| colspan="6" style="text-align:center;background-color: #e9e9e9;"| General Election, November 2, 1982

References

1931 births
2017 deaths
Deaths from cancer in Wisconsin
Dominican College of Racine alumni
Educators from Wisconsin
Military personnel from Wisconsin
Wisconsin city council members
Mayors of places in Wisconsin
Democratic Party members of the Wisconsin State Assembly
Politicians from Racine, Wisconsin
United States Army personnel of the Korean War
People from Caledonia, Wisconsin